José Manuel Botella Crespo (1949 – 22 January 2021) was a Spanish politician who served as a Deputy and as a member of Corts Valencianes.

References

1949 births
2021 deaths
Members of the Corts Valencianes